This is a list of Members of Parliament (MPs) elected to the Parliament of Ghana for the First Parliament of the Fourth Republic of Ghana at the 1992 parliamentary election, held on December 29, 1992. The preceding presidential election was considered to have been conducted in a free and fair manner by international observers. The opposition parties however claimed the election was fraudulent and boycotted this parliamentary election.

The list is arranged by region and constituency. New MPs elected since the general election and changes in party allegiance are noted at the bottom of the page.

Composition

The NPP, PNC, PHP and NIP all boycotted the parliamentary election and thus had no seats in parliament.

List of MPs elected in the general election
The following table is a list of MPs elected on 7 December 1996, ordered by region and constituency. The previous MP and previous party column shows the MP and party holding the seat.



By-elections
New Edubiase constituency - 30 September 1993 - Theresa Joyce Boaffoe (NDC) beat Samuel Amoah (NPP) by a majority of 5,766.
Wenchi East constituency - 24 January 1995 - Hayford Osei Kwadwo (NDC) won from a field of four with a majority of 3,144 to take the seat.
 Tano South constituency - 7 February 1995 - Nana Koduah Kwarteng (NDC) beat Kofi Akrowiah (PCP) to second place with a majority of 3,867 from a field of four candidates.
 Navrongo Central constituency - 4 July 1995 - John Setuni Achuliwor (Independent) won the seat with a majority of 196.

Notes and references

See also
1992 Ghanaian parliamentary election
Parliament of Ghana
Daniel Francis Annan - Speaker of the First Parliament of the Fourth Republic

External links and sources
 Elected Parliamentarians - 1992 Elections, Electoral Commission of Ghana, Archived from original on 12 January 2011 
1992 Parliamentary elections results
African Elections Database

1992